L.A. Rush, known as Rush in the PlayStation Portable version, is an open world racing video game developed by Midway Studios – Newcastle and published by Midway Games, released in North America for PlayStation 2 and Xbox (not compatible with Xbox 360) on 10 October 2005, and on 21 October in Europe. It was released for Microsoft Windows on 4 November in Europe, and for PlayStation Portable on 7 November 2006. It is the fourth and final instalment in the Rush series.

The game was originally planned to be available on Gizmondo, but got cancelled on 6 February 2006, due to the discontinuation of the console. L.A. Rush features voice talent from Orlando Jones, Bill Bellamy, André 3000 and Twista.

Gameplay 

The game features free-roaming with race mechanics similar to those in Need for Speed: Underground 2. The GPS map can have a point assigned to a certain location and then the point shows up on the minimap during gameplay. It also features two mission types and two game modes. Other features include 50 vehicles, 30 different cruise missions (can be played with another player on the PSP version when connected to Wi-Fi), upgrades for cars (available from multiple top-line manufacturers and West Coast Customs) and a hip hop and rock soundtrack from various artists, such as Twista, Lil' Kim, Skinny Puppy, J-Kwon and Rock 'n Roll Soldiers.

There are two modes in the game; Battle mode (which was first introduced in the home version of Rush 2049) lets the players go head-to-head with each other in a power-up-propelled race, while the Stunt Arena mode (which was featured in all other home Rush games) is only available in the PSP version of the game, where the player must launch their car off the ramp and fly through the air performing different tricks. In order to keep up with points, the player must land their car safely on all four wheels.

Aside from two modes, there are two mission types available; the Reacquire missions involve the player recovering the cars that have been repossessed from the storyline and bringing them back to the garage with minimal damage, whilst avoiding enemy vehicles that try to ram the player. The Retribution missions involve property damage where the player is tasked to destroy various things that belonged to Lidell in different ways.

Up to 50 playable cars are featured in the game, 30 of which are licensed cars, while the rest are Midway concept cars.

Plot 
Trikz Lane (Luis Da Silva) is a renowned street racer in Los Angeles, who has been earned a well-known sizeable reputation since he started racing in his blue Nissan 240SX (S14), which is referred to as the "go-kart", while being accomplished and supported by his friend, Ty Malix (Orlando Jones). The two kept winning races across the city, winning their first prize money that worth ten grand, prompting them to become wealthy entrepreneurs, owning a mansion in Beverly Hills and a large collection of cars. One night, while throwing a party in their mansion, the duo invites the Rides magazine to propose on featuring the S14 in the magazine's next front page cover, and the West Coast Customs (Ryan Friedlinghaus, Quinton "Q" Dodson, Michael "Mad Mike" Martin and Dana "Big Dane" Florence) on modifying the car for the cover. The two meets Lidell Rey (Bill Bellamy), a local race promoter, whose hosting a series of street races in his own event, the Lidell Rey Street Slam. Having not a fond of Trikz, Lidell tries to fight against him, willing not to pay Trikz's vacation spot in Maui, Hawaii at the end of the summer, and to prevent him from taking his girlfriend, Lana. He later drops a few pennies from his hat, telling Trikz that "change is coming". 

Two weeks later, Trikz and Ty returns home after a vacation in Saint Barthélemy, only to find their mansion left abandoned in the ruins, and their S14 left damaged in their driveway. Much of their assets and cars stored inside have been repossessed, including the Hummer H2 that they were driving upon arrival. The duo reveals that Lidell has robbed their mansion using his connections when they were away. To give payback against Lidell, Trikz enters the Lidell Rey Street Slam, while Ty went to find the lost cars that were stashed across L.A.

Trikz completes the first and second stage of races that were held respectively in the Hollywood and Santa Monica areas. In the middle of those stages, Ryan Friedlinghaus, whose have been hired by Ty, calls Trikz, informing about Lidell's properties that needed to be destroyed, in which Trikz manages to do so; these includes five billboards located in the Hollywood area, and the Pacific Wheel in the Santa Monica Pier. Trikz also receives a call from Lana during the first half of the Santa Monica stage, who started helping him to find the missing cars.

Upon arriving South Central Los Angeles for the third stage, Trikz and Ty visits the West Coast Customs branch in Carson to meet the shop's crew about the modification ideas for the S14. After winning all the races in the South Central stage, Trikz gets a challenge from Lidell's unnamed professional street racer (Twista), whose arrived in L.A. for the fourth stage in the South Bay area. Lidell provides the racer and his crew, a lineup of Midway concept cars to race, however, Trikz steals one of Lidell's delivered concept cars in the middle of the stage by Ryan's orders, and having it destroyed by a train.

After completing the South Bay stage, Trikz and Ty heads to the final stage that takes place in Downtown Los Angeles. Lidell and his racer demands a rematch to the duo, which Ty summarize this by offering them a "three large" bet, which Lidell's racer accepts. Meanwhile, Ryan calls Trikz again, orders him to destroy a lineup of high-end cars that belongs to Lidell by pushing them off on a rooftop garage in a preparations of a photo shoot. Amidst on seeing his defeated racers and most of his destroyed property, Lidell challenges Trikz for a final duel across Downtown L.A. using a Saleen S7, but Trikz manages to overtake him and won the race.

After Lidell's defeat, Trikz and Ty regains all of their assets and cars, bringing their mansion back to normal, with a night party been held again. Trikz's S14 returned from West Coast Customs in a modified state, featuring a jacuzzi with a plasma television screen on the back of the car. Trikz goes for his one-month vacation to Maui, with Lana joining him, and will continue racing upon returning from the trip.

Reception

Many reviewers have been critical of the game. One common criticism is that the ability to customize cars was poorly realized; players cannot modify them themselves, instead, the car is automatically upgraded by the West Coast Customs crew. GamesRadar says: "Roll your vehicle into the garage and they'll kit it out with what they feel like".

L.A. Rush has also been criticized for not including every area of Los Angeles; for example, the San Fernando Valley was excluded.

Not all reaction was negative. The realistic handling in the game was welcomed by some as being comparable to the handling in Juiced and Need for Speed: Underground 2.

Nominations

References 

2005 video games
Gizmondo games
Midway video games
Multiplayer and single-player video games
PlayStation 2 games
PlayStation Portable games
Open-world video games
Racing video games
Video games developed in Canada
Video games developed in the United Kingdom
Video games featuring black protagonists
Video games set in Los Angeles
Windows games
Xbox games
Street racing video games
Works about vacationing